Ba Myint (born 13 November 1950) is a Burmese dental professor who served as Rector of the University of Dental Medicine, Yangon from 2004 to 2007. He was the fourth president of the Myanmar Dental Association (MDA) from 1998 to 2008.

Early life and education
Ba Myint was born in Pathein, Myanmar on 25 May 1945. He graduated from university in July 1965. He received Ph.D from Japan in 1995.

See also
 Myanmar Dental Council
 University of Dental Medicine, Mandalay

References

Burmese dental professors
1950 births
Living people
University of Calcutta alumni
People from Yangon